Karim Rouani (born 8 March 1982) is a French former professional footballer who played as a striker.

Career
Rouani was born in Bordeaux.

He left in January 2009 R.O.C. de Charleroi-Marchienne and moved to Moroccan side Olympique Safi.

He signed for Malaysian team Perak FA, a team in the Malaysia Super League for the 2013 season. He made his debut with Perak in February, in a league game against Terengganu FA. signed for Stuttgarter Kickers four months later.

References

External links
Footgoal profile

1982 births
Living people
Footballers from Lille
French sportspeople of Moroccan descent
French footballers
Moroccan footballers
Association football forwards
FC Girondins de Bordeaux players
Moroccan expatriate footballers
Expatriate footballers in Belgium
R. Olympic Charleroi Châtelet Farciennes players
Moroccan expatriate sportspeople in Belgium
Expatriate footballers in Portugal
G.D. Chaves players
Perak F.C. players
Stuttgarter Kickers players
Moroccan expatriate sportspeople in Portugal
Expatriate footballers in Hungary
Budapest Honvéd FC players
Moroccan expatriate sportspeople in Hungary